Rodolphe Thomas (born 8 August 1962) is a French politician and member of the MoDem.

Born in Falaise, he moved to the new town of Hérouville-Saint-Clair in 1966, where his parents opened one of the first stores in the city.

After one term in the municipal council, sitting on the right-wing opposition benches, he won a surprise victory in the traditionally Socialist town of Hérouville-Saint-Clair in the 2001 local elections, mostly due to the division of the left. He became first vice-president of the Agglomeration community of Caen la Mer. In the 2002 legislative election, he defeated the Socialist incumbent Louis Mexandeau in the Calvados's 2nd constituency as a Union for French Democracy (UDF) candidate.

He was politically close to Jean-Louis Borloo, but also a close supporter of UDF leader François Bayrou. However, he supported Nicolas Sarkozy in the second round of the 2007 presidential election and ran for re-election supported by the Presidential Majority and Bayrou's new party, the MoDem. He was, however, defeated by Laurence Dumont (PS).

Following his defeat, he became a closer supporter of Bayrou and ran simultaneously for re-election as Mayor of Hérouville-Saint-Clair in the 2008 municipal elections but also against a PS incumbent in Caen's 6th canton in the cantonal elections. He was re-elected Mayor with over 53% of the votes by the first round, and won his cantonal race in Caen-6 in the runoff.

In 2009, he was selected to be the MoDem's candidate in Lower Normandy for the 2010 regional elections.

References

1962 births
Living people
People from Falaise, Calvados
Politicians from Normandy
Union for French Democracy politicians
Democratic Movement (France) politicians
Mayors of places in Normandy
Deputies of the 12th National Assembly of the French Fifth Republic